The Șugag is a left tributary of the river Dobra in Romania. It flows into the Dobra near Jina.

References

Rivers of Romania
Rivers of Sibiu County